Rhodope was a late Roman and early Byzantine province, situated on the northern Aegean coast. A part of the Diocese of Thrace, it extended along the Rhodope Mountains range, covering parts of modern Western Thrace (in Greece) and south-western Bulgaria. The province was headed by a governor of the rank of praeses, with Trajanopolis as the provincial capital. According to the 6th-century Synecdemus, there were six further cities in the province, Maroneia, Maximianopolis, Nicopolis, Kereopyrgos (unknown location) and Topeiros (mod. Toxotai in Greece).

The province survived until the Slavic invasions of the 7th century, although as an ecclesiastic province, it continued in existence at least until the 12th century. The theme of Boleron covered most of the area in later Byzantine times.

References

Sources 
 

Roman Thrace
Greece in the Roman era
Provinces of the Byzantine Empire
Late Roman provinces
Rhodope Mountains
Praetorian prefecture of the East